HMS Imperieuse was the lead ship of her class of two armoured cruisers built for the Royal Navy in the 1880s. She was sold for scrap in 1913.

Design and description
The steel-hulled ships were fitted with a ram and their hulls were sheathed in teak which was covered in copper to reduce biofouling. Their crew numbered approximately 555 officers and other ranks.

The ship had two 3-cylinder, inverted compound steam engines, each driving a single propeller, using steam provided by a dozen oval and cylindrical boilers. The engines produced  used forced draught and Imperieuse reached  on her sea trials.

Construction and career
Imperieuse was laid down at Portsmouth Royal Dockyard on 10 August 1881, launched on 18 December 1883, and completed in September 1886. She was the flagship of the China Station from 1889 to 1894 and the Pacific Station from 1896 to 1899. She underwent extensive repairs at Chatham in early 1900.

Imperieuse was renamed Sapphire II in February 1905 and reclassified as a depot ship for destroyers at Portland. Her name was reverted to Imperieuse in June 1909. She was sold on 24 September 1913 to Thos. W. Ward of Morecambe for breaking up.

Notes

References

External links

 http://www.battleships-cruisers.co.uk/hms_imperieuse.htm

 

Imperieuse-class cruisers
Ships built in Portsmouth
1883 ships
Victorian-era cruisers of the United Kingdom